Fist of Fury 1991 II (漫畫威龍) is a 1992 Hong Kong comedy film co-directed by Cho Chung-sing and Corey Yuen and starring Stephen Chow in the lead role. It is a sequel to the film Fist of Fury 1991 and likewise parodies Hong Kong martial arts films, including Chow appearing in a yellow tracksuit similar to the one worn by Bruce Lee in the 1973 film Enter the Dragon. Josephine Siao stars as Peony, a masked hero named after a flower parodying Black Rose, a popular character in Hong Kong films directed by Yuen Chor in the 1960s.

Plot
After Kwok Wai is defeated by Lau Ching in the final round of the martial arts tournament, his elder brother Cheung Wan-To and his gang seek revenge. When Ching begins acting strangely due to his sorrow over the loss of his mentor, his four teachers from the New Jingwu School pledge to take care of him. Ngou Pi is a fervent Lau Ching fan who meets his hero then returns home to find his aunt Ngou Chat pretending to commit suicide out of shame that he is not yet married. Ngou Pi tells her his intention to learn kung fu, then he seeks out Ching in Kowloon and becomes his student.

Wan-To and his gang attack Ching and Ngou Pi in the street, but a masked woman intervenes and saves them. Ching takes refuge at Ngou Pi's house and meets his cousin Yuen Chuen, who looks exactly like his girlfriend Min, and his aunt Ngou Chat, whom Ching recognises as the mysterious masked woman. Ngou Pi finally works up the courage to confess his love to his cousin Yuen Chuen and she agrees to marry him. Ngou Chat explains to Ching that she does not want Ngou Pi to learn kung fu because his father was killed in a duel.

Ngou Pi and Yuen Chuen are kidnapped by Wan-To, who forces Ching to battle him in a public match for their release. Ngou Chat teaches Ching martial, including a special skill known as the Electric Fist, while his friend Smartie attempts unsuccessfully to woo her. Ching battles Wan-To in the ring and defeats him. During the closing credits Wan-To is shown living as a beggar following his defeat.

Cast

Stephen Chow as Lau Ching
Josephine Siao as Peony/Ngou Chat
Kenny Bee as Chu Kor Chun a.k.a. "Smartie"
Sharla Cheung as Man/Yuen Chuen
Pak-Cheung Chan as Ngou Pi
Wan Yeung-ming as Cheng Wan-To
Rico Chu as Maddy
Yeung-Ming Wan as Cheung Wai
Tak Yuen as Ngou Feng
Siu-Wai Mui as Chu-Chu
Feng Ku as Chu-Chu's Father
Yuen-Yee Ng as Landlady
Dung Hoh as Referee
Yan Sing as Fisherman
Chi Tung as Keung
Fung Woo as Ching's Trainer
Man-Biu Pak as Uncle Bill
Szema Wah Lung as Ching's Trainer
Hsin Liang as Ching's Trainer
Yuen Kai Chan as Market Merchant
Tak-Kan San as Tournament Judge
Adam Chung-Tai Chan as To's Thug
Stone Chan as To's Thug
Sang Wook Kim as To's Thug
Miu Ting Kong as To's Thug
Shung Fung Lau as To's Thug
Pomson Shi as To's Thug
Chin-Hung Fan as To's Thug
Derek Cheung Chi-Chuen as Cornerman

Reception
Reviewer Kozo of lovehkfilm.com called Fist of Fury 1991 II a "generally funny but overall not-so-spectacular comedy featuring Mr. Comedy himself, Stephen Chow."

Reviewer Ryo Saeba of darksidereviews.com gave the film a rating of 5/10, writing, "Still, even if the film is uneven, there are still some very good gags and the presence of Cheung Man is always a pleasure for the eyes, especially when you have two for the price of one."

onderhond.com gave the film a rating of 3.0/5.0, writing, "A simply but amusing sequel that sees Stephen Chow taking another jab at the famous Bruce Lee classic. If you like Chow's trademark comedy, there's plenty to enjoy here. Some crazy fight scenes, some utterly daft but hilarious jokes and solid pacing. It's not the greatest film ever, but it's damn good filler."

References

External links
 
 Fist of Fury 1991 II at HKCinemagic
 

1992 films
1992 martial arts films
Hong Kong slapstick comedy films
Hong Kong martial arts comedy films
1990s parody films
1990s Cantonese-language films
Films directed by Corey Yuen
Films set in Hong Kong
Films shot in Hong Kong
1992 comedy films
Hong Kong sequel films
1990s Hong Kong films